Mukhamedyanovo (Möxämätyän) is a rural locality (a village) in Abzanovsky Selsoviet, Zianchurinsky District, Bashkortostan, Russia. The population was 146 as of 2010. There is 1 street.

Geography 
Mukhamedyanovo is located 66 km southeast of Isyangulovo (the district's administrative centre) by road. Alibayevo is the nearest rural locality.

References 

Rural localities in Zianchurinsky District